Klaas Bakker (22 April 1926 – 3 January 2016) was a Dutch footballer. He played as a midfielder and striker.

Club career
He played for De Volewijckers between 1943 and 1951, and later for Ajax until 1957. He was born in Amsterdam, North Holland.

Bakker died on 3 January 2016 in Amstelveen, aged 89.

Statistics for Ajax

References

Evert Vermeer, Marcelle van Hoof. Ajax 100 Jaar Jubileumboek 1900-2000. Amsterdam: Luitingh-Sijthoff, 1999. 

1926 births
2016 deaths
Footballers from Amsterdam
Association football forwards
Dutch footballers
AVV De Volewijckers players
AFC Ajax players